Isodemis phloiosignum is a species of moth of the family Tortricidae first described by Józef Razowski in 2013. It is found on Seram Island, Indonesia.

The wingspan is about 26 mm. The ground colour of the forewings is cream, slightly tinged with rust and suffused with rust in the basal half of the wing. The markings are ferruginous, mixed with black towards the tornus. The hindwings are dark grey brown, strigulated (finely streaked) with yellow ferruginous and brown in the apex area.

Etymology
The species name refers to the shape of the signum and is derived from Greek phloioi (meaning to swell).

References

Moths described in 2013
Archipini